Deborah Margaret Lavin, FRSA (born 22 September 1939), is a South African academic and historian, resident in the United Kingdom for most of her career.

Biography
Lavin was born on 22 September 1939. She attended Rhodes University, South Africa and Lady Margaret Hall, Oxford, graduating in 1961.

Lavin has lectured at the University of Witwatersrand as well as Queen's University Belfast and was a Senior Associate of St Antony's College, Oxford. In 1980 she relocated to Durham where she was co-director of the Research Institute for the Study of Change and a lecturer in the Department of Modern History, as well as Principal of Trevelyan College from 1979 to 1995. She was President of the Howlands Trust and from 1995 to 1997 was Principal-elect of the new College to be developed at the Howlands Farm, which eventually became Josephine Butler College.

Bibliography
South African Memories: Scraps of History, Ad. Donker, 1979 (co-author)
From Empire to International Commonwealth: A Biography of Lionel Curtis, Oxford, 1995
The Condominium Remembered:Proceedings of the Durham Sudan Historical Records Conference 1982, University of Durham, Centre for Middle Easte, 1993

References

1939 births
South African emigrants to the United Kingdom
20th-century South African historians
Living people
Principals of Trevelyan College
Academics of Durham University
Alumni of Lady Margaret Hall, Oxford
Rhodes University alumni
Place of birth missing (living people)
Academic staff of the University of the Witwatersrand
Academics of Queen's University Belfast
Historians of South Africa